Sörenberg is a village in the Swiss Alps, located in the southern part of the canton of Lucerne. The village lies in the municipality of Flühli in the Entlebuch region, near the upper end of the Waldemme valley.

On its south side the village is overlooked by the Brienzer Rothorn, the highest mountain in the canton of Lucerne. On the west is the Schrattenfluh, a large karstic mountain. To the east, the Glaubenbielen Pass crosses to Giswil in the canton of Obwalden.

In winter Sörenberg includes a ski area. A year-round cable car leads to the summit of the Brienzer Rothorn.

References
Swisstopo topographic maps

External links

Sörenberg.ch (official website)
Sörenberg on Wanderland.ch

Villages in Switzerland
Ski areas and resorts in Switzerland
Geography of the canton of Lucerne